Vaneese Yseult Thomas (born August 24, 1952) is an American R&B, jazz and soul blues singer, best known for her 1987 US Billboard R&B chart hit single, "Let's Talk It Over". In addition, in more recent times, she has supplied backing vocals on a long list of other musicians' work. Thomas has appeared at the Montreux Jazz Festival, and at the 2006 Pleasantville Music Festival. At the 36th Blues Music Awards, she was nominated in two categories; firstly for the 'Soul Blues Album' award for her 2013 album, Blues for My Father, and also as the 'Soul Blues Female Artist'.

Life and career
Born in Memphis, Tennessee, United States, she is the youngest child of Rufus Thomas; her brother Marvell and sister Carla are also musicians. Vaneese Thomas enjoyed some success in the late 1980s, with her solo releases being made on the Geffen Records label. Her self-titled debut album spawned a couple of Top 20 US R&B hit singles in "Let's Talk It Over", which featured a saxophone solo by Najee, and "(I Wanna Get) Close To You" in 1987. Follow up releases did not sustain her earlier success levels, but she switched to working as mainly a backing vocalist appearing on many recordings made by other musicians. Her session duties included working alongside Lenny White, Bob James, Carl Anderson, Freddie Jackson, Beau Williams, Melba Moore, Joe Cocker, Sarah Dash, Luciano Pavarotti, Sting, Stevie Wonder, Michael Jackson, Celine Dion, Eric Clapton, Carly Simon, and Dr. John.

On November 15, 1998, she released her album When My Back's Against The Wall. Billboard described the album as "a small label masterpiece that begs for attention from savvy majors".

In addition to her concerts and numerous recordings, Thomas has worked in both film and television. She provided the voice of Grace the Bass on the PBS children's television series, Shining Time Station, and of Clio the Muse in the Disney film, Hercules. Thomas has also sung on film soundtracks including Anastasia (1997), Mighty Aphrodite and The First Wives Club. On television, Thomas has made appearances on Late Show with David Letterman, Late Night with Conan O'Brien, and the NBC show Today.

Her work has included record producing, supervising vocal arrangements and song writing duties.  Her material has been recorded by Patti Austin ("A Candle", "Rain Rain Rain"), Freddie Jackson (Just Like the First Time), Bob James ("Gone Hollywood"), Larry Coryell ("This Love of Ours"), and Melba Moore (A Lot of Love). Diana Ross had a Top 10 UK hit single with the Thomas penned "One Shining Moment". Her production credits include Patti Austin's Street of Dreams (1999), Sarah Dash's Your All I Need (1988), and Freddie Jackson's, Just Like the First Time (1986).

Thomas helped in the foundation of the Swarthmore College Gospel Choir, where she was formerly a pupil.

In 2008, Thomas and James D-Train Williams won the Odyssey Award as joint narrators of Walter Dean Myers' audiobook, Jazz.

Her most recent release was Blues for My Father (2013), for which Thomas wrote most of the material. The tracks include a 'duet' with her late father, and another with her sister, Carla Thomas, on the song "Wrong Turn".

Personal life
Thomas lives in Westchester County, New York, with her husband and fellow songwriter and producer, Wayne Warnecke. She once taught in a school in France when she resided in that country for a time and, more recently, taught at the City College of New York.

Discography

Albums

Chart singles

References

External links

Videoed interview

1952 births
Living people
African-American women singer-songwriters
American rhythm and blues singer-songwriters
20th-century American singers
21st-century American singers
Musicians from Memphis, Tennessee
Singer-songwriters from Tennessee
Record producers from Tennessee
Geffen Records artists
City College of New York faculty
Swarthmore College alumni
20th-century American women singers
21st-century American women singers
American women record producers
20th-century African-American women singers
21st-century African-American women singers